Jan Tarło may refer to the following Polish noblemen:
Jan Tarło (d. 1550), standard-bearer of Lwów
Jan Tarło (d. 1572), cup-bearer of the Crown, starost of Pilzno
Jan Tarło (1527–1587), voivode of Lublin, starost of Łomża and Pilzno
Jan Tarło (1684–1750), voivode of Lublin and Sandomierz, starost of Medyka, Sokal, Jasło and Grabowiec